"Sharazan" is a song by Italian duo Al Bano and Romina Power, released in 1981. It was an international commercial success and remains one of their best-known hits.

Meaning of the word

They are told to say that Sharazan means "Dreamland", what would fit to the Italian text.

There is a German Cover by Marco Bakker, the meaning there is the name of a girl in a far, probably Arabic country ("Rose im Wüstensand").

Another cover named "Parmesan", by a satirical Czech band "Triky a pověry" (meaning "Tricks And Superstitions", a name that sounds like Ricchi e Poveri: the band produced a dozen of parodies of Italian hits), stated that "parmesan is spread on bread".

Track listing
7" Single
A. "Sharazan" – 4:45
B. "Prima notte d'amore" – 2:55

Spanish 7" Single
A. "Sharazan" – 3:54
B. "Na, na, na" – 3:30

Chart performance

References

1981 singles
1981 songs
Italian pop songs
Number-one singles in Switzerland
Male–female vocal duets
Al Bano and Romina Power songs
Songs written by Al Bano